José Gonzalo Zulaica (10 January 1886 in San Sebastián, Spain – 30 August 1956), better known by his pen name Aita Donostia (Father Donostia or Father San Sebastian, because he was a priest born in San Sebastian, Donostia in the Basque language), was a Spanish and Basque musicologist and composer. He was also known as José Antonio de Donostia.

From 1936 to 1943 he was in exile in France.
 
His most popular work is the Basque Preludes, a set of fifteen piano pieces inspired by Basque traditional music, arranged in a very romantic way, that reminds Robert Schumann's and Edvard Grieg's styles.

Selected discography
 Ahots eta pianorako musika (I) - Complete music for voice and piano
 Ahots eta pianorako musika (II)
 Ahots eta pianorako musika (III) Almudena Ortega, soprano and Josu Okiñena, piano NB001 2005
 Ahots eta pianorako musika (IV) Almudena Ortega, soprano and Josu Okiñena, piano NB002 2006

References

Basque classical composers
Spanish musicologists
1886 births
1956 deaths
Exiles of the Spanish Civil War in France
People from San Sebastián
Spanish male classical composers
Spanish classical composers
20th-century Spanish people
20th-century classical composers
20th-century musicologists
20th-century Spanish male musicians
20th-century French male musicians